Douglas Joseph Bennet Jr. (June 23, 1938 – June 10, 2018) was an American political official and college president. He was the fifteenth president of Wesleyan University, in Middletown, Connecticut, from 1995 to 2007. Before that, he served as Assistant Secretary of State for International Organization Affairs in the Clinton Administration (1993–95) and Assistant Secretary of State for Legislative Affairs in the Carter administration (1977–79), was the President and CEO of National Public Radio (1983–93), and ran the United States Agency for International Development under President Carter (1979–81).

Early life and education
Born in Orange, New Jersey, to Douglas Joseph Bennet Sr. and Phoebe (Benedict) Bennet, Bennet grew up in Lyme, Connecticut, and attended the local public schools. He earned a Bachelor of Arts degree from Wesleyan University in 1959, an M.A. in history from the University of California, Berkeley in 1960, and a doctorate in history from Harvard University in 1968.

Career
He was an assistant to Ambassador to India Chester Bowles in the 1960s.

In 1970, he announced his candidacy for the Democratic primary for Connecticut's 2nd congressional district, which was vacated by the death of Congressman William St. Onge, but later withdrew from the race.  In 1974, he sought the Democratic nomination for the same seat, but was defeated at the district convention by Christopher Dodd.

He later served on the staffs of Missouri Senator Thomas Eagleton, Minnesota Senator Hubert H. Humphrey, and Connecticut Senator Abraham Ribicoff. In 1977, Bennet became United States Assistant Secretary of State for Legislative Affairs.

Bennet succeeded John J. Gilligan as the administrator of the United States Agency for International Development in 1979, where he served for two years. After heading a private research institute, he was named head of NPR in 1983. In 1993, President Bill Clinton named Bennet as Assistant Secretary of State for International Organization Affairs, where he served until 1995.

In April 1995, Bennet succeeded William Chace, becoming the fifteenth president of Wesleyan University.

On May 4, 2006, Bennet announced that he would step down as president following the 2006–2007 academic year.  The last several years of his twelve-year presidency were contentious in some respects, with opposition by a minority in the student body on certain matters.  Some students believed Bennet's fundraising priorities conflicted with the interests and needs of the student body, and the university's mission of education. A student movement came to a head in December 2004, when approximately 250 students (of more than 2,700 undergraduates) protested in front of the administrative building South College, where Bennet's office was located, demanding that he address student concerns.  On March 26, 2007, Wesleyan's Board of Trustees announced that Michael S. Roth would succeed Bennet as president for the 2007–2008 academic year.

Awards
In 1994, Bennet received an honorary doctor of laws degree from Wesleyan; in 2008, he received an honorary doctor of laws degree from Trinity College. In 2011, Bennet was named a fellow of the American Academy of Arts and Sciences. In 2012, a residence hall in the Fauver Frosh housing complex at Wesleyan was renamed Bennet Hall in honor of former President Bennet.

Personal
On June 27, 1959, Bennet married Susanne Klejman of Washington, D.C. They have three children, Michael, James, and Holly. They divorced in 1995. In 1996 he married Midge Bowen Ramsey, a vice president at National Public Radio.

References

|-

Presidents of Wesleyan University
1938 births
2018 deaths
Harvard Graduate School of Arts and Sciences alumni
Wesleyan University alumni
UC Berkeley College of Letters and Science alumni
United States Assistant Secretaries of State
People from Orange, New Jersey
Fellows of the American Academy of Arts and Sciences
American chief executives in the media industry
Administrators of the United States Agency for International Development
Carter administration personnel